Camille Cornelie Isbert (1825–1911) was a French painter of miniatures.

Biography
She was born to Louis Paillard and Marie-Joséphine Jeannon in 1825.

She exhibited her work at the Woman's Building at the 1893 World's Columbian Exposition in Chicago, Illinois.

She died in 1911.

References

External links
 images of Isbert's work on ArtNet

1825 births
1911 deaths
19th-century French women artists
19th-century French painters